Jonah Richard Guimond (born November 8, 1995), known professionally as P'tit Belliveau, is a French-Canadian and Acadian folk and country musician from Clare, Nova Scotia who presently lives in Moncton, New Brunswick. He is most noted for his 2020 album Greatest Hits Vol. 1, which was longlisted for the 2020 Polaris Music Prize.

Guimond began making electronic music as a teenager, with his music evolving toward country after he was given a banjo by his grandfather. Although now more based in bluegrass, his style still incorporates some synthesizers and drum machines.

With his band Les Grosses Coques, he was a finalist in the 2019 edition of the Francouvertes. Greatest Hits Vol. 1, his debut album, was released in March 2020.

Biography
Guimond grew up in St. Marys Bay, Nova Scotia, learning piano and guitar. As a teenager, he began with experiment with synthesizers and first released music under the name Jonah MeltWave. As a teenager, he also played with the indie-punk band Peter Pansbridge, which released the album Manter ketspidge in 2014, and the short-lived band Intense sound dynamite, which released two singles in 2012.

References

Acadian people
Canadian folk singer-songwriters
Canadian country singer-songwriters
Canadian banjoists
French-language singers of Canada
Musicians from Nova Scotia
Musicians from Moncton
Living people
1995 births